Michael Trevino (born January 25, 1985) is an American actor. He is best known for his roles as Tyler Lockwood on The CW's The Vampire Diaries; and as Kyle Valenti in Roswell, New Mexico.

Early life
Trevino was born in Los Angeles. He was raised in Montebello, California, and later moved to Valencia. His mother was originally from Zacatecas, Mexico, and his father was born in Fresno, California, to Mexican immigrants.

Career

Trevino played the role of Jackson Meade, similar to Meade Milk, in the Disney Channel Original Movie Cow Belles. He has also appeared as a guest star on  Cold Case, Without a Trace, Bones, The Mentalist  as Bradon Fulton in season 1 episode 19 and Commander in Chief. Trevino also had a small role on the TV series Charmed in the eighth season episode, "Malice in Wonderland", as Alastair. He also had a recurring role on The Riches on FX, playing high school student Brent, in a four-episode story arc in season 1, and appeared in the third episode of season 2.

He played the role of Jaime Vega on the short-lived 2007 television series Cane. In 2008, Trevino was cast for a three-episode arc on The CW's 90210, playing Ozzie, a student at West Beverly Hills High School and love interest for Naomi.

Beginning in 2009, Trevino starred as Tyler Lockwood in the series The Vampire Diaries on The CW. Trevino appeared as the same character in a recurring role on the Vampire Diaries spin-off series The Originals in 2013, the first major character to transition from one show to another. In April 2015, it was announced that Trevino would be leaving The Vampire Diaries after the end of the sixth season, like his co-star Nina Dobrev.

As of 2019, he stars in the CW's Roswell, New Mexico.

Filmography

Film

Television

Awards and nominations

References

External links

 
 Michael Trevino on Twitter

1985 births
21st-century American male actors
American male actors of Mexican descent
American male film actors
American male television actors
Living people
Hispanic and Latino American male actors
Male actors from California
People from Montebello, California
People from Valencia, Santa Clarita, California